Noel Benjamin "Ben" Sherwell (16 March 1904 – 29 December 1960) was an English first-class cricketer active 1923–39 who played 36 First-class matches for Middlesex and University of Cambridge. He was born in Hendon, educated at Tonbridge School and Gonville and Caius College, Cambridge.  He died near Chur in Switzerland.

References

External links
 Ben Sherwell at ESPN Cricket Info

1904 births
1960 deaths
People educated at Tonbridge School
Alumni of Gonville and Caius College, Cambridge
English cricketers
Middlesex cricketers
Cambridge University cricketers
Gentlemen cricketers
Free Foresters cricketers